General's Highway Corridor Park is located at 1758 Crownsville Road, in the town of Crownsville, Maryland, United States. It is located near the site of the annual Maryland Renaissance Festival in the heart of Anne Arundel County.

The park is maintained by the Anne Arundel County Department of Recreation and Parks. Additional work – such as planting native plants and maintaining a nature trail – is provided by a group of volunteers called the General's Highway Environmental Project.

The park is open to the public all year round, from sunrise to sunset.

Park information
 Ownership: Anne Arundel County Department of Recreation and Parks 
 Address: 1758 Crownville Road, Crownsville, Maryland, 21401 
 ADC Map location: page 19, grid E5
 Size:

Facilities

External links
 General's Highway Corridor Park - Anne Arundel County Department of Recreation and Parks

Parks in Anne Arundel County, Maryland